Political obligation refers to a moral requirement to obey national laws. Its origins are unclear, however it traces to the Ancient Greeks. The idea of political obligation is philosophical, focusing on the morality of laws, rather than justice. Discussion of political obligation grew during the era of social contract theory, in which Thomas Hobbes and John Locke were crucial in explaining the idea and its importance. Political obligation is distinct from legal  obligation.

History 
The idea of political obligation was renewed by Thomas Hill Green around the late 1800s. Green discussed the idea as "obedience to the law." A more detailed look at the term can be traced to Socrates and Plato. Dudley Knowles considered the topic in his book Political Obligation: A Critical Introduction.

Socrates 
The earliest understanding of political obligation can be traced back to the teachings of Socrates. One account recalls his imprisonment and death sentence for "corrupting the morals of the youth". Instead of escaping, he chose to stay and accept his punishment, as he found it morally wrong to evade his punishment. In Crito, Socrates describes the struggle man has with the rule of law and the connection it has with political obligation.

Divinity and morality 
One claim is that the obligations of an individual to society is divinely ordained. Christianity has been a catalyst in this thinking. This requires acceptance of the existence of the divine and the linkage between the divine and the political realms are clear.

Social contract 
Hobbes believed that society needed authority in order to thrive. More specifically, he saw it as a fight among humans to wield power. Hobbes accepted the idea of political obligation, stating that government and laws were needed to thrive as a society. Hobbes and Locke agreed on the idea of individual freedom. They both saw that this freedom was limited and accompanied by an obligation to obey the law.

References 

Political philosophy